Aleksey Ivanovich Zalesky (born 7 October 1994) is a Belarusian professional football player currently playing for Caspiy. His older brother Andrey Zalesky is also a professional footballer.

References

External links
 Profile at pressball.by
 
 

1994 births
Living people
Belarusian footballers
Association football defenders
Belarusian expatriate footballers
Expatriate footballers in Kazakhstan
FC Dinamo Minsk players
FC Bereza-2010 players
FC Slutsk players
FC Vitebsk players
FC Luch Minsk (2012) players
FC Dnyapro Mogilev players
FC Minsk players
FC Caspiy players
FC Torpedo-BelAZ Zhodino players